Jozef Lohyňa (born 1963) is a Slovak wrestler. He was born in Zlaté Moravce. He won an Olympic bronze medal in Freestyle wrestling in 1988 and a gold medal at the 1990 World Wrestling Championships in Tokyo, competing for Czechoslovakia. He represented Czechoslovakia at the 1992 Olympics, and competed for Slovakia at the 1996 Olympics.

References

1963 births
Living people
People from Zlaté Moravce
Sportspeople from the Nitra Region
Czechoslovak male sport wrestlers
Slovak male sport wrestlers
Olympic wrestlers of Czechoslovakia
Olympic wrestlers of Slovakia
Wrestlers at the 1988 Summer Olympics
Wrestlers at the 1992 Summer Olympics
Wrestlers at the 1996 Summer Olympics
Czech male sport wrestlers
Olympic bronze medalists for Czechoslovakia
Olympic medalists in wrestling
Medalists at the 1988 Summer Olympics